Joseph Long trained at The Guildhall School of Music & Drama and has gone to have a long career as an actor. His performing credits include three West End Shows, theatre tours and in repertory and community theatre, most recently in 2019  playing the lead role as Dr Iannis in Captain Corelli’s Mandolin on tour and in London at the Harold Pinter Theatre.
However, most of his work has been performing on camera in countless TV and Film productions. Most recent Television shows include Holby City, Casualty, Peaky Blinders, Spooks, Poirot, Silent Witness, Zen, Tyrant, Pennyworth. Three series of Ashes to Ashes as Luigi, and twice appeared in Doctor Who, firstly as Rocco Colosanto and secondly, the Pope. In recent films he has worked on Dracula Untold, Redemption, American Assassin, Murder on the Orient Express, We Die Young and the yet to be released, Waiting for the Barbarians with Mark Rylance.

Filmography

References

External links

Living people
Year of birth missing (living people)
English people of Italian descent
English male film actors
English male television actors